The 1983 Idaho State Bengals football team represented Idaho State University as member of the Big Sky Conference during the 1983 NCAA Division I-AA football season. The Bengals were led by first-year head coach Jim Koetter and played their home games at the ASISU MiniDome, later renamed Holt Arena, an indoor venue on campus in Pocatello, Idaho. After a disappointing season in 1982, the Bengals finished second in the Big Sky with a 5–2 record, and were 8–3 overall in the regular season. Led by senior quarterback Paul Peterson, Idaho State hosted the first round of the 12-team I-AA playoffs, but lost to conference champion Nevada by seven points.

Koetter was promoted to head coach in early June after Dave Kragthorpe left to become athletic director at his alma mater, Utah State in Logan.

Schedule

References

Idaho State
Idaho State Bengals football seasons
Idaho State Bengals football